Dadès River is a river in Morocco. It is a tributary of the Draa River.

Geography
The Dadès River rises in the High Atlas and then turns south crossing through the Dadès Gorges, then westward between the High Atlas and Anti-Atlas mountain ranges. The river finally  meets the Ouarzazate River, which then enters Draa River.

Dades Gorge is easily accessible by taxi from nearby Tinerhir.  The scenery is significant with views of interesting rock formations.  The valley itself is made lush and green by the river, while the surrounding area is rocky desert.  There are simple communities still living here in traditional houses.  Women can be seen washing laundry in the river and laying it to dry on the surrounding bushes.

Hydrology
Flow rate of the Dadès River is highly seasonal with peak flows in the January to April period following the high precipitation and ensuing snowmelt.  The water quality is alkaline, and summer water temperatures are in the range of 23 to 28 degrees Celsius.  Electrical conductivity of the water is relatively high.

References

External links

Personal website with travel photos and video from a trip to the Todra and Dades Gorges

Rivers of Morocco
Atlas Mountains